The Community of the Ark is a small spiritual commune in southern France that was founded in 1948 by Lanza del Vasto. Lanza del Vasto was a non-violence activist and disciple of Mahatma Gandhi. During the 1970s, many of the communards, under the leadership of del Vasto, took a leading role in the civil disobedience campaign resisting the proposed extension of the military base on the Larzac plateau. The campaign was ultimately triumphant.

In the 1970s, the community spread to several locations, including Italy, Spain and Quebec. In the 1990s, some communities were closed due to conflicts and lack of new members.

External links
 About the Community of the Ark
 L'Arche de Saint Antoine (The Ark of Saint Antoine) website in French and English.

Further reading
 Mark Shepard: The Community of the Ark. A Visit With Mahatma Gandhi's Disciples in the West. Ocean Tree Books, Santa Fe (New Mexico) 1992, .

Gandhians
Vegetarian communities
Utopian communities